{{Speciesbox
| name = Eudonia steropaea
| image = Eudonia steropaea female.jpg
| image_caption = Female
| image2 = Eudonia steropaea male.jpg
| image2_caption = Male
| taxon = Eudonia steropaea| authority = (Meyrick, 1884)
| synonyms =

| synonyms_ref = 
}}Eudonia steropaea'' is a species of moth of the family Crambidae. It was named by Edward Meyrick in 1884. Meyrick gave a detailed description of this species in 1885. It is endemic to New Zealand.

The wingspan is 13–16 mm. The forewings are pale fuscous, irrorated with darker. There is a small blackish spot at the base of the inner margin and a straight black streak from the base to somewhat before the middle of the disc, almost meeting a triangular blackish blotch. The first line is indicated by an angulated darker posterior margin. The second line is white. The hindwings are grey-whitish, the hindmargin somewhat suffused with darker. Adults have been recorded on wing in January.

References

Eudonia
Moths of New Zealand
Moths described in 1884
Endemic fauna of New Zealand
Taxa named by Edward Meyrick
Endemic moths of New Zealand